George McCluskey (b. Coventry, England) is a British actor.

References

Living people
English male film actors
Actors from Coventry
Year of birth missing (living people)